Congoprinsia is a genus of moths belonging to the family Tortricidae. It contains only one species, Congoprinsia juratae, which is found in the Democratic Republic of the Congo.

The wingspan is 12–14.5 mm. The ground colour of the forewings is ferruginous cream with rust coloured suffusions and strigulation and a few paler spots in a reticulate area subterminally. The costa and termen are spotted rust. The markings are rust brown with dark brown parts. The hindwings are brownish grey, but paler and tinged cream apically.

Etymology
The genus is named after Jurate and Willy De Prins, who have made significant contributions to the knowledge of the Ethiopian Lepidoptera. The species is named in honour of Jurate De Prins, who collected the species.

See also
List of Tortricidae genera

References

External links
tortricidae.com

Tortricini
Insects of the Democratic Republic of the Congo
Moths of Africa
Monotypic moth genera
Taxa named by Józef Razowski
Endemic fauna of the Democratic Republic of the Congo